Adam Reideborn (born 18 January 1992) is a Swedish professional ice hockey goaltender. He is currently playing with CSKA Moscow of the Kontinental Hockey League (KHL).

Playing career
Reideborn made his Swedish Hockey League debut playing with Modo Hockey during the 2014–15 SHL season.

After the 2015–16 season, despite appearing in a career high 32 games he was unable to prevent Modo from suffering relegation, Reideborn opted to remain in the SHL, signing a two-year contract to return to Djurgårdens IF. Reideborn was awarded the Honken Trophy as the best goaltender in the 2018–19 SHL regular season.

On 24 May 2019, Reideborn left the SHL after his strong season, securing his first contract abroad, agreeing to a one-year deal with Russian outfit, Ak Bars Kazan of the KHL.

After two season with Ak Bars Kazan, Reideborn left the club as a free agent and signed a two-year contract with CSKA Moscow on 1 June 2021.

Personal life 
His sister, Sofia Reideborn, played professionally with SDE Hockey in the SDHL.

Career statistics

International

Awards and honours

References

External links

1992 births
Living people
Ak Bars Kazan players
Almtuna IS players
IF Björklöven players
HC CSKA Moscow players
Djurgårdens IF Hockey players
Modo Hockey players
Ice hockey people from Stockholm
Swedish ice hockey goaltenders
Timrå IK players
Wings HC Arlanda players
Ice hockey players at the 2022 Winter Olympics
Olympic ice hockey players of Sweden